Christian Erwig (born 16 February 1983 in Dorsten) is a German retired footballer.

Career
He made his Bundesliga debut on 25 February 2007, when he came on as a substitute in the 87th minute for FC Schalke 04 in a game against Bayer 04 Leverkusen, replacing Halil Altıntop.

Honours
 Bundesliga runner-up: 2006–07

References

1983 births
Living people
German footballers
FC Schalke 04 players
Fortuna Düsseldorf players
FC Schalke 04 II players
Sportfreunde Lotte players
Bundesliga players
3. Liga players
TSV Marl-Hüls players
VfB Hüls players
Association football forwards
SuS Stadtlohn players
People from Dorsten
Sportspeople from Münster (region)
Footballers from North Rhine-Westphalia